Rilwan Waheed is a Maldivian professional footballer. Nicknamed "Riley", he plays as a winger for Club Green Streets and the Maldives national team.

Club career

Club Valencia

2006 & 2007 season
Rilwan signed with Club Valencia at the age of 15 in 2006, but the FAM rules did not allow him to play at senior level football. In the following year 2007, at the age of 16, he started playing in the 1st Division.

He made his debut on 30 July 2007 against New Radiant as a substitute in the second half of the match where they won 1–0.

Rilwan ended his debut season with third in league, runner up in the FA Cup and crowning the Cup Winners' Cup.

2008 season
Rilwan was used as a substitute in the season most of the time and featured in a few games. He played his Cup Winners' Cup debut on 16 February, coming on as a 65th-minute substitute for the goal scorer Ubaidhulla Hassan in a 2–1 defeat against New Radiant. Despite the bitter start of the season with two losses in the Cup Winners Cup and starting from the bench in the second half in both matches they played against New Radiant SC in the group stage, Rilwan was included in the starting lineup for the quarter final match of the FA Cup against FC Baaz in which they won 8–0 and scored two goals.

Rilwan played his first league match of the season on 25 June against VB Sports Club coming in to play in the second half, coming on for Ahmed Nashid in the 59th minute where they lost the match 3–2. He played his first full match in the league that season on 19 July in the 3–1 win against Thinadhoo ZC. He was also cautioned in that match. On 30 August, Club Valencia won the 2008 Dhivehi League title and Rilwan came in to play as a substitute in the final match against New Radiant in which they won the match 2–1.

On 15 September, Rilwan played his first ever President's Cup final against Victory Sports Club and they went on winning the match 3–2. Mohamed Rifau scored the winning goal from a diving header by a cross provided by Rilwan.

2009 season
Rilwan started the 2009 season as a first team player, on 29 January in the Charity Shield match against VB Sports Club where they went on to win the game by 2–1.

On 5 May, Rilwan scored his first ever AFC Cup goal on his debut against Provincial Electricity Authority of Thailand in the 4–1 away defeat from a penalty when he was just 18 years old.

He was involved in three league goals in the season. His first contribution was to assist Ibrahim Shiyam to score against Kalhaidhoo, on 9 July. He was also sent-off with a second caution for a hand ball inside the penalty area, resulting in a penalty for the opposition team. On 10 September, Rilwan provided assists for captain Mohamed Jameel and Ahmed Thariq, one for each in their 3–2 win against All Youth Linkage, their last league game of the season.

2010 season
On 25 April, Rilwan was sent off for a slap on Mukhthar Naseer's face during the 1–1 draw league game against Victory. Rilwan scored his first ever league goal on 16 May against Vyansa to put his side 1–0 up, by a thunderbolt shot out from the middle of the opposition half which hit the post before finding the back of the net. The game ended with a 3–0 victory. On 17 July, Rilwan was again sent off for making a harsh tackle against Ali Umar inside the penalty box and giving away a penalty for VB Sports Club, ending the match with a 3–1 defeat.

Rilwan missed two of his penalties in the penalty shoot-out during the FA Cup 2010. On 30 September, his first spot kick was saved by Maziya goalkeeper Ahmed Athif in the quarter finals but won the shoot-out by 3–1 after match ended as a 1–1 draw after 120 minutes. He missed his second penalty, which went wide against Victory in the semi finals, on 5 October. They lost the shoot-out by 4–1 after 2–2 at the end of extra time.

2011 season
In his last season for Valencia, he made 14 league appearances with one goal. His last goal for the club was scored on 18 September against Maziya in the final league game, scoring the equalizing goal in the 1–1 draw.

Victory Sports Club

2012 season
Rilwan signed for Victory Sports Club at the age of 20 and the team management decided to include him in the club's 2012 FAM Youth Championship as the captain. They crowned the under-21 champions for the first time and Rilwan scored one goal in the competition against Club Eagles from a spot kick in a semi final match, where they lost 2–1.

Rilwan made his senior debut for Victory on 18 February 2012 in the 2012 AFC Cup qualifying play-off. They lost the match 3–4 to Yemen's Al-Tilal. Victory's second goal of the match was scored by captain Shafiu Ahmed, a header from a corner kick cross taken by Rilwan.

In his first season playing for Victory, he made 16 appearances in the League and ended the season as runners-up. They were also the runners-up of President's Cup, losing 2–1 to New Radiant where Rilwan failed to score in the penalty shoot-out, and Charity Shield losing 1–0 to VB Addu FC in the extra time.

New Radiant Sports Club

2013 season
On 24 October 2013, Rilwan agreed to join New Radiant under two-year contract. He was assigned the number 8 shirt.

Rilwan made his debut for New Radiant in the MILO Charity Shield match where they won 3–1 against Maziya on 21 February 2013.

Rilwan had an impressive and also one of the successful season with New Radiant in 2013. He was a part of the squad which won the domestic quadruple in the Maldives with a remarkable 100% winning record for the first time in the Maldives. He won his first FA Cup in the 2013 season, along with the 2013 Dhivehi League, 2013 President's Cup and the 2013 Charity Shield. Rilwan also played in the 2013 AFC Cup in which they reached the quarter-finals.

On 14 January 2014, New Radiant terminated the contract with Rilwan, with one year remaining, due to an argument with their captain Imran Mohamed during a practice session where Rilwan used offensive and abusive language towards Imran in front of other teammates and supporters. Rilwan was also fined by one month salary and asked to apologize the coach and his teammates during the month of May 2013, for actively participating in a futsal tournament held in Malaysia without the approval from the club.

Maziya Sports & Recreation Club

2014 season
On 15 January 2014, the following day Rilwan's contract with New Radiant was terminated, he signed a one-year deal with Maziya Sports & Recreation Club.

On 11 March 2014, Rilwan made his Maziya debut in the 2014 AFC Cup group stage match against Selangor of Malaysia, where they managed to get a point with a 1–1 draw at home. He was sent off during his first league game of the season, where the match ended 2–2 against B.G. Sports Club on 19 June with two cautions. He missed one match due to suspension and played his next match against his former club Victory, on 6 July and provided two assists; for Ashad Ali and Riste Naumov. The match ended with huge 5–1 win.

On 3 August 2014, during the 1–0 league win against his former club New Radiant, his knee got injured and was out for approximately three months.

Return to New Radiant Sports Club

2015 season
On 18 December 2014, Rilwan completed his return to the club and signed a two-year contract and claimed his number 8 shirt.

Rilwan made his official return debut against Lao Toyota FC in the 2015 AFC Cup on 11 March 2015, coming into play as a substitute at half-time. They won the match by 2–1. On 20 April, Rilwan was sent-off in the first league game of the season against Victory, where they won by 3–1, after the foul he committed to Ahmed Ziyan. He was later suspended for two league games with a fine of MVR 4000 regarding the incident. On 8 July 2015, during his first game after returning from suspension, Rilwan conceded a penalty for a handball against Valencia, but won the game by 3–1. Rilwan scored his first New Radiant goal, on 16 July against Club Eagles, taking the lead in the fourth minute but ending the match with a 1–1 draw. On 26 September, Rilwan scored the opening goal again, against Club Eagles but this time in the President's Cup semi-finals. They ended the match with a 2–1 win, advancing to the President's Cup final. Rilwan scored his second league goal against Maziya on 20 October, where he scored the only goal of the match, collecting Mohamed Rasheed's long through ball inside the penalty box and volleyed it over goalkeeper Pavel Matyash.

2016 season
On 22 February 2016, Rilwan was assigned as the joint vice captain of New Radiant with Ahmed Niyaz, under the captaincy of Mohamed Rasheed.

On 23 February, Rilwan scored in the season debut against Balestier Khalsa in the 2016 AFC Cup group stage match. He came into play as a substitute in the 69th minute and scored in the dying second of the game to level the score 2–2.

International career

Under-23
Rilwan was preceded as the captain of the Maldives national under-23 football team till the mid-2012 but later his captaincy was succeeded by Hassan Adhuham in the 2012 Rajapaksa International Trophy and he was given the vice-captaincy of the team.
Rilwan scored the opening goal from a free kick and supplied a good long through ball to Asadhulla who curled in to the goal to score the second, in the 2012 Rajapaksa International Trophy Final against Pakistan to win Maldives national under-23 football team's first ever gold medal.

Senior team
Rilwan made his debut in a friendly match against Thailand on February 24, 2012

2012 AFC Challenge Cup was his first major tournament with the senior team and he played all the matches as a right back at 2012 AFC Challenge Cup for the Maldives. Their first goal of the tournament came with a header from a cross by Rilwan in to the penalty area of Turkmenistan. After the great performance in the tournament, he was one of the most hopeful young players in the Maldives, and also included in the Haveeru Sports Awards' best 5 players of 2012 AFC Challenge Cup. He is the only Maldivian player nominated for the 2012 AFC Challenge Cup's best Under-21 player Award.

Despite being with minor injuries, national coach István Urbányi decided to include Rilwan in the 20 men squad for the 2013 SAFF Championship. He only featured in the game against Bhutan in the group stage match where they won 8–2, replacing Shafiu Ahmed for the final 10 minutes.

Career statistics

Club

1.Maldivian Cup Winners Cup.
2.2012 AFC Cup qualifying play-off.
3.2015 POMIS Cup.

International

International goals

Under–23
Scores and results list Maldives U–23's goal tally first.

Awards and honours

Valencia
Dhivehi League: 2008
President's Cup: 2008
FA Charity Shield: 2009
Maldives Cup Winners' Cup: 2007

Victory Youth
Youth Championship: 2012

New Radiant
FA Charity Shield: 2013
Dhivehi League: 2013
Dhivehi Premier League: 2015
Maldives FA Cup: 2013
President's Cup: 2013

Maziya
Maldives FA Cup: 2014

Maldives U–23
Rajapaksa International Trophy: 2012

Individual
2012 Haveeru Sports Award for the best Under–23 footballer.

References

External links
 

1991 births
Living people
Maldivian footballers
Maldives international footballers
Club Valencia players
Victory Sports Club players
New Radiant S.C. players
People from Malé
Association football wing halves
Footballers at the 2010 Asian Games
Asian Games competitors for the Maldives